Igor J. Karassik (December 1, 1911 in Saint Petersburg, Russian Empire – July 2, 1995 in Maplewood, New Jersey) was a Russian-American engineer known for his pioneering work with pumps, a field in which he was "world-renowned" and an "outstanding authority".

Early life
Karassik was born to a wealthy Russian-Jewish family.  His father, a mechanical engineer, Ivan Karassik (1880—1969) was a son of a Kharkov merchant Nukhim-Perets (Peter) Karasik (c. 1849—1906).  His mother Malvina Barjansky (1882—1967) was a daughter of an Odessa 1st guild merchant, composer, and pianist Adolf Barjansky (c. 1850—1900).  Igor had an older sister Helen (1909—1990). The family immigrated to the United States in 1923 to escape the Russian Revolution. He attended Carnegie Institute of Technology, and also studied in Turkey and France.

Professional life
In 1934 or 1936, Karassik joined the Worthington Corporation; by 1974, he was a vice-president. He subsequently worked for Dresser Industries. In 1980, he became the first recipient of the American Society of Mechanical Engineers' Henry R. Worthington Medal for achievement in the field of pumping.

He wrote over 1100 technical articles and papers on pump use and maintenance, as well as several books, including Centrifugal Pump Selection, Operation and Maintenance, Engineers' Guide to Centrifugal Pumps, and Centrifugal Pump Clinic; he also co-wrote Pump Questions and Answers, and co-edited Pump Handbook.

In 1996, the Thirteenth Pump Users Symposium was dedicated to his memory.

References

1911 births
1995 deaths
Carnegie Mellon University alumni
Fellows of the American Society of Mechanical Engineers
American people of Russian descent
American people of Russian-Jewish descent
20th-century American engineers
American engineering writers
People from Maplewood, New Jersey
List
Soviet emigrants to the United States